Kachkarinsky is a rural locality (a settlement) in Samosdelsky Selsoviet, Kamyzyaksky District, Astrakhan Oblast, Russia. The population was 177 as of 2010. There is 1 street.

Geography 
Kachkarinsky is located 45 km southwest of Kamyzyak (the district's administrative centre) by road. Obrastsovo-Travino is the nearest rural locality.

References 

Rural localities in Kamyzyaksky District